The sharpchin barracudina (Paralepis coregonoides) is a species of fish in the family Paralepididae (barracudinas).

Description

It has 67–73 vertebrae The dorsal fin is well behind the midpoint; the anal fin is far back, with 22–24 finrays.

Habitat

Behaviour
The sharpchin barracudina feeds on fish and crustaceans. It spawns in March to September. It is eaten by tuna, cod, lancetfish, Atlantic salmon and seals.

References

Paralepididae
Fish of the Atlantic Ocean
Fish of the Mediterranean Sea
Fish described in 1820
Taxa named by Antoine Risso